Sakhawat Naz is a Pakistani stand-up comedian and actor from Faisalabad, Punjab, Pakistan. He is best known for his work in Pakistan theatre. Naz's television work includes appearances in Khabarnaak and Mazaaq Raat. He is often considered one of the most popular comedians of Lahore Theater.

Early life
Sakhawat Naz was born in Faisalabad, Punjab, Pakistan.

Career

Theatre
He started his career from Faisalabad at age 12. He has had major roles in a dozen classic plays at Theatre of Pakistan also known locally as 'stage dramas'.

Television
In 2010, He joined Khabarnaak, a GEO TV comedy satire show. He appeared on the show as Jeda. In 2013, Naz left the show and started a similar program on Dunya News called Mazaaq Raat. He began playing Pappu All-rounder, an unemployed young man with multiple skills.

Film
In 2019, he played a supporting role in film Daal Chawal (2019).

Personal life
He is married and has two children. His brother is stage actor Sajan Abbas. His family business is selling home-paint.

Filmography

Film

Television

Theatre 
 Unknown year : Feeqa In America

References

External links

Living people
Year of birth missing (living people)
Pakistani male film actors
Pakistani male television actors
Pakistani stand-up comedians
People from Faisalabad
Punjabi people